The 1957 Rice Owls football team represented Rice University during the 1957 NCAA University Division football season. The Owls were led by 18th-year head coach Jess Neely and played their home games at Rice Stadium in Houston, Texas. They competed as members of the Southwest Conference, winning the conference with a conference record of 5–1. After two consecutive losing seasons in 1955 and 1956, Rice bounced back to finish the 1957 regular season with a record of 7–3. They won the last four games of the regular season, including a victory over the undefeated and number one-ranked Texas A&M Aggies, coached by Bear Bryant. The Owls were ranked eighth in the final AP Poll and seventh in the final Coaches Poll, which were conducted before bowl season. Rice was invited to the 1958 Cotton Bowl Classic, held on New Years' Day, where they were defeated by fifth-ranked Navy.

The season-opening victory vs. 1957 is the Owls' most recent at Tiger Stadium. Rice is 0-14-1 in Baton Rouge since.

Schedule

References

Rice
Rice Owls football seasons
Southwest Conference football champion seasons
Rice Owls football